Robin Tyson is an English countertenor who has a well documented career in opera, solo, and a cappella. He now works in the music management industry.

He sang in the Choir of King's College, Cambridge from 1989–1992. He is known for singing as a soloist with John Eliot Gardiner's Bach Cantata Pilgrimage in 2000. Tyson performed and recorded Francesco Cavalli's opera La Calisto at La Monnaie in Brussels, conducted by René Jacobs. He was a member of The King's Singers from 2001 to 2009, with whom he won a Grammy Award for the album Simple Gifts. 
He started the music agency at Edition Peters in 2011. He is manager for Voces8, Apollo5 composers Ēriks Ešenvalds, Ola Gjeilo and others.

Tyson joined the King's Singers as the second countertenor in 2001, in place of Nigel Short. He left in 2009 and was succeeded by Timothy Wayne-Wright. Tyson was part of the King's Singers production of Spem in Alium by Thomas Tallis, a 40-part piece. Unlike his only countertenor counterpart, David Hurley, Tyson used his falsetto voice to reach higher notes, while Hurley was able to sing some of his notes without falsetto. Tyson released, along with the Grammy winning Simple Gifts, From Byrd to the Beatles, a documentary covering the making of Spem in Alium, along with numerous other albums and singles.

On leaving the King's Singers he was Head of Artistic Management at Gabrieli Consort and Players before starting and leading the Artist Agency at Edition Peters.

References

External links 
 LinkedIn
 Robin Tyson Podium Music

Operatic countertenors
British performers of early music
Living people
Date of birth missing (living people)
Place of birth missing (living people)
20th-century British male  opera singers
21st-century British male  opera singers
Year of birth missing (living people)
Choral Scholars of the Choir of King's College, Cambridge